Jean George Cook (born 14 August 1991) is a South African rugby union player. His usual position is flanker or number eight and he most recently played for Japanese Top League club Kintetsu Liners.

Career

He returned to the Cheetahs for the 2014 Super Rugby season.

Zebre

Cook signed with ZebrePro12 where he played 8 games, 426 minutes, coming on as replacement for 1.

Kintetsu Liners

Cook joins Kintetsu Liners

References

External links
 
 Jean Cook at itsrugby

1991 births
Living people
Alumni of Grey College, Bloemfontein
Blue Bulls players
Bulls (rugby union) players
Cheetahs (rugby union) players
Expatriate rugby union players in Italy
Expatriate rugby union players in Japan
Free State Cheetahs players
Hanazono Kintetsu Liners players
Rugby union flankers
Rugby union number eights
Rugby union players from Pietermaritzburg
South Africa Under-20 international rugby union players
South African expatriate rugby union players
South African expatriate sportspeople in Italy
South African expatriate sportspeople in Japan
South African people of British descent
South African rugby union players
Zebre Parma players